Mikhail Sergeyevich Biryukov (28 April 1992 – 4 October 2019) was a Russian junior tennis player. His highest ATP singles ranking was 292. After his retirement from professional tennis at age 22, he served as a coach of under 16 player Alexey Zakharov.

Tennis career

On 21 August 2010, Mikhail, representing Russia, won the doubles silver medal in the inaugural Youth Olympic Games held in Singapore with Victor Baluda. Mikhail and Victor were defeated by the Briton Oliver Golding and by the Czech Jiri Vesely 6–3, 6–1.

Personal life and death 
Biryukov was the son of four-time World Champion in modern pentathlon, Irina Kiseleva. On 4 October 2019, Biryukov was found dead in Moscow. He died by suicide.

References

External links 

 

1992 births
2019 deaths
Tennis players at the 2010 Summer Youth Olympics
Russian male tennis players
Suicides in Moscow
Russian tennis coaches